Caloptilia sphenocrossa is a moth of the family Gracillariidae. It is known from Java, Indonesia and Pahang, Malaysia.

The larvae feed on Cajanus cajan. They mine the leaves of their host plant.

References

sphenocrossa
Moths of Asia
Moths described in 1934